George Steven Agee (born November 12, 1952) is a United States circuit judge of the United States Court of Appeals for the Fourth Circuit and a former justice of the Supreme Court of Virginia.

Background 
Born in Roanoke, Virginia, Agee was educated at Bridgewater College (Bachelor of Arts), the University of Virginia School of Law (Juris Doctor) and New York University School of Law (Master of Laws, Taxation). He has litigated cases in Virginia and federal courts, including arguing for the appellant before the Supreme Court of the United States in Patterson v. Shumate, 504 U.S. 753 (1992).

From 1982 to 1994, he served in the Virginia House of Delegates. Opting to pursue the Republican nomination for Attorney General of Virginia in 1993, he did not seek re-election to the House.

Judicial career

State judicial service 
In 2001, he became a Judge of the Court of Appeals of Virginia. In 2003, he was elevated to the Supreme Court of Virginia, filling the vacancy created by Chief Justice Harry L. Carrico, who took Senior Justice status.

Federal judicial service 
Agee was nominated on March 13, 2008 by President George W. Bush to fill a vacancy on the Fourth Circuit created by Judge J. Michael Luttig, who resigned on May 10, 2006. President Bush asked the Senate to consider his nomination swiftly because of the court’s heavy caseloads, and because five of the fifteen seats were vacant. Agee received a hearing before the Senate Judiciary Committee on May 1, 2008, and was unanimously voted out of committee on May 15, 2008. Agee was confirmed on May 20, 2008, by a 96–0 vote. Agee was the fourth judge nominated to the Fourth Circuit by Bush and confirmed by the United States Senate. He received his commission on July 1, 2008, and was sworn in by his colleague and former law professor, United States Circuit Judge James Harvie Wilkinson III, on July 2, 2008.

Notable rulings 
In 2016, Agee found that sectarian prayers offered by Rowan County, North Carolina commissioners at their meetings did not violate the Establishment Clause of the United States Constitution, over the dissent of Judge Wilkinson.  That judgment was then rejected by the full circuit en banc by a vote of 10-5, with Wilkinson now writing for the majority while Agee and Paul V. Niemeyer authored dissents. In June 2018, the Supreme Court of the United States denied review, over the written dissent of Justice Clarence Thomas joined by Neil Gorsuch.

References

External links

Markon, Jerry, "U.S. Appeals Court Gets New Judge," The Washington Post, July 31, 2008.
Sluss, Michael, "Senate confirms Agee for judgeship," The Roanoke Times, May 20, 2008.
Schapiro, Jeff, "Agee's move to federal court could spark another Va. political feud," Richmond Times-Dispatch, May 20, 2008
Simon, Neil H., "Va. Justice Agee Clears Hurdle for Federal Post," Media General News Service, May 15, 2008.
Marcy, Jessica, "Judge from Salem gets nod for federal post," The Roanoke Times, March 14, 2008.
Simon, Neil H., "Virginia Supreme Court Justice Agee picked for U.S. court," Richmond Times-Dispatch, March 14, 2008.
Reichmann, Deb, "Va. Justice Nominated to Appeals Court," Associated Press, March 13, 2008.
White House Profile of G. Steven Agee
 "Patterson v. Shumate Case Summary and Oral Argument," The Oyez Project.

1952 births
21st-century American judges
Bridgewater College alumni
Judges of the United States Court of Appeals for the Fourth Circuit
Living people
Republican Party members of the Virginia House of Delegates
Politicians from Roanoke, Virginia
United States court of appeals judges appointed by George W. Bush
Virginia lawyers
Justices of the Supreme Court of Virginia